Tetraulax minor is a species of beetle in the family Cerambycidae. It was described by Stephan von Breuning in 1958. It is known from Zambia and Kenya.

References

Tetraulaxini
Beetles described in 1958
Taxa named by Stephan von Breuning (entomologist)